Black Stone Cherry is the debut album by American hard rock band Black Stone Cherry. It was released on July 18, 2006, through Roadrunner Records. The album has produced three singles: "Lonely Train", "Hell and High Water" and "Rain Wizard".

As of 2008, the album had sold around 110,000 copies.

Track listing

Credits 
Chris Robertson – lead vocals, lead guitar
Ben Wells – rhythm guitar, backing vocals
Jon Lawhon – bass, backing vocals
John Fred Young – drums, backing vocals
Reese Wynans – B3 organ on "Rollin' On" and "Tired of the Rain"

In pop culture 
The track "Lonely Train" was the official theme song for WWE's The Great American Bash (2006). It was later featured in the wrestling video game WWE Smackdown vs. Raw 2007.

References

External links 
Black Stone Cherry's official website
Roadrunner Records

2006 debut albums
Black Stone Cherry albums